Maine Pyar Kiya is a 2014 Indian Telugu-language romantic drama film directed by debutant Pradeep Madugula and starring Pradeep Ryan, Isha Talwar, Satyadev and Madhumitha.

Cast 

Pradeep Ryan as Naveen
Isha Talwar as Shalini
Satyadev as Bharath
Madhumitha as Malathi
Rama Rao as Tanga Velu
Venu as Naveen's friend
Komal Jha as Bhargavi
Posani Krishna Murali
Kathi Mahesh
Viva Harsha
Sivannarayana Naripeddi as software company MD
Abhinav Gomatam
Uttej

Production 
The film is a romantic drama with an IT backdrop and released on 20 June 2014. The film marks the directorial debut of Pradeep. Isha Talwar was cast after the makers liked her performance in Thattathin Marayathu (2012).

Soundtrack 

The songs were composed by Pradeep Kumar.

Release 
The Times of India gave the film a rating of three out of five stars and stated that "Even though, the reason for the lead-pair’s split is strong enough, the narration lacks depth and the director fails to bring out the emotions". Deccan Chronicle gave the film two-and-half out of five stars and wrote that "The story is predictable and does not have many twists and the climax could have been better and a rather unconventional one". 123Telugu gave the film a rating of two-and-three-quarters out of five and stated that "On the whole, Maine Pyar Kiya has its engaging moments and only picks up during the second half. If you can sit through the simple and quite predictable first half, and can tolerate Posani’s crazy histrionics, you can easily give this film a try". Webdunia criticized the film's predictability and comedic scenes.

References 

2014 directorial debut films
Indian romantic comedy-drama films
2014 romantic comedy-drama films
2010s Telugu-language films
2014 drama films